Into Darkness may refer to:

 Star Trek Into Darkness, a 2013 film in the Star Trek franchise.
 Into Darkness (album), the first and only full-length album of American doom metal band Winter

See also
 Into Cold Darkness, the second album by Vital Remains